Bert Joris (born 18 January 1957 in Antwerp) is an internationally renowned jazz trumpeter, composer and arranger from Belgium. In 1996 he received the Golden Django.

External links
 Official website

Belgian jazz trumpeters
1957 births
Living people
Musicians from Antwerp
21st-century trumpeters
Belgian jazz composers
Music arrangers